Charles Hauert (26 April 1908 – 19 January 1995) was a Swiss fencer. He competed in the team épée event at the 1936 Summer Olympics.

References

External links
 

1908 births
1995 deaths
Swiss male épée fencers
Olympic fencers of Switzerland
Fencers at the 1936 Summer Olympics